McLinden is a surname. Notable people with the surname include:

Dursley McLinden (1965–1995), Manx actor
Mark McLinden (born 1979), Australian rugby union and rugby league player
Melissa McLinden (born 1964), American volleyball player
Paul McLinden, Scottish musician and songwriter